Acadoparadoxides is an extinct genus of redlichiid trilobite belonging to the family Paradoxididae. These fast-moving low-level epifaunal carnivores lived in the Middle Cambrian (abt 500 Ma).

Selected species

The following species have been described:

References

Redlichiida genera
Paradoxidoidea
Cambrian trilobites
Prehistoric life of Europe
Fossil taxa described in 1957

Cambrian genus extinctions